Trezzo Tinella is a comune (municipality) in the Province of Cuneo in the Italian region Piedmont, located about  southeast of Turin and about 50 kilometres northeast of Cuneo.

The small and affable commune of Trezzo Tinella is located high in the Langa region. At the centre of the commune is a church and the town hall. There was once a castle, the final tower of the castle collapsed in 1969. There was also a nursery and school which was closed in 1986. Trezzo Tinella has dairy farms, vineyards, hazelnut groves and houses. A number of the buildings date back to Roman Times and the names derive from this era.

Trezzo Tinella borders the following municipalities: Alba, Borgomale, Castino, Mango, Neviglie, and Treiso.

Demographic evolution

References

Cities and towns in Piedmont